The Hub City Hot Shots were an amateur baseball club located in Aberdeen, South Dakota. They were formed in 2018. The Hot Shots were a part of the Expedition League and were in the Lewis Division. In their two seasons, they had gone 51-73.

Record By Year

Suspended Operations
On September 4, 2019, Expedition League President, Steve Wagner, announced that they would suspend operations for the 2020 season. Also, the Aberdeen Parks and Recreation Board announced that they would be terminating the contract with the Hot Shots for the use of Fossum Field and  its concessions.

References

Amateur baseball teams in South Dakota
Sports teams in Aberdeen, South Dakota
Defunct baseball teams in South Dakota
Expedition League
Baseball teams disestablished in 2020
Baseball teams established in 2018
2018 establishments in South Dakota
2020 disestablishments in South Dakota